Ruslan Nakifovych Hilazyev (born 7 January 1977 in Odessa, Ukrainian SSR) is a Ukrainian retired professional footballer who played as a midfielder and manager.

Career
He is the product of the Chornomorets Odesa Youth Team.  He started his career at the local Dynamo-Flash at that time playing the Second League. Later he moved to Moldova to play for Zimbru Chișinău and then back to Ukraine in Desna Chernihiv. Ruslan Hilazyev returned to his home town to play for Chornomorets Odesa in 2001. While playing to Moldova, Hilazyev helped Zimbru Chișinău to bring two league Divizia Naţională titles. In Chornomorets during the 2005–06 season, Ruslan Hilazyev helped the club achieve a bronze spot in the Ukrainian Championship.

Honors
Team
Moldovan National Division: 1998–99 (1st), 1999–2000 (1st)
Ukrainian Premier League: 2005–06 (3rd)

References

External links

1977 births
Living people
Ukrainian footballers
Ukrainian expatriate footballers
Expatriate footballers in Moldova
FC Chornomorets Odesa players
Footballers from Odesa
FC Desna Chernihiv players
FC Zimbru Chișinău players

Association football midfielders